Following are the results of the 2006 NHRA Powerade Drag Racing Series season.  The 2006 season would be the last time a national event would be held at National Trail Raceway near Columbus, Ohio. The event was replaced with the Summit Racing Equipment Nationals at Summit Motorsports Park in Norwalk the next year. It is also the final year before the Countdown to the Championship format change.

Schedule

Points standings

Drivers in bold have clinched the championship

References 

NHRA
NHRA Powerade